Athletics competitions at the 2013 Central American Games were held at the Estadio Nacional in San José, Costa Rica, between March 9–12, 2013. The two marathon events were held on March 17. A total of 41 events were contested, 20 by men and 21 by women. Men's pole vault, hammer throw, decathlon, and 35 km race walk, as well as women's high jump and pole vault were cancelled because the required minimum participation of 3 countries was not achieved.

Medal summary

Complete results and medal winners can be found on the CADICA webpage.

Men

Women

Medal table
The medal table (until March 12 without the marathon events) was published.

Participation
A total of 175 athletes (100 men and 75 women) from 7 countries were reported to participate: 

 (7)
 (54)
 (14)
 (39)
 (10)
 (18)
 Panamá (33)

References

2013
2013 Central American Games
Central American Games
2013 Central American Games